The second deputy prime minister of Spain, officially Second Vice President of the Government of Spain, is a senior member of the Government of Spain. The office of the Second Deputy Prime Minister is not a permanent position, existing only at the discretion of the Prime Minister. It is a constitutional office because it is foreseen in the Constitution when it provides for the possibility of existing more than one Vice Presidency.

The current second deputy prime minister is Yolanda Díaz, who is also minister of Labour and Social Economy.

History 
The possibility for the creation of this office was established in the Organic Act of the State of 1967. This act established a Council of Ministers composed by the Prime Minister, the Deputy Prime Minister or more than one Deputy PM and the Ministers. However, the clause was not used until the dictator split the office of head of government and head of state in 1973. In 1974, prime minister Arias Navarro used this possibility to give more relevance to Antonio Barrera Irimo, Minister of Finance. He did the same with its new Finance Minister Rafael Cabello de Alba in October 1974.

During his third term, Arias Navarro appointed Manuel Fraga as such, being at the same time Minister of the Interior. Adolfo Suárez did the same with his Interior Minister, Alfonso Osorio García, who was also Minister of the Presidency. From 1977 to 1981, Suárez appointed his Finance Ministers as Second Deputies and during his short term, Calvo-Sotelo did the same.

Socialist PM González never used this possibility on his almost 14 years of premiership. José María Aznar and José Luis Rodríguez Zapatero did it, following the tradition of appointing as Second Deputy to their Finance Minister. However, a cabinet reshuffle in 2011 granted the position of Second DPM to the Minister of Territorial Policy and Civil Service, Manuel Chaves.

The conservative PM Mariano Rajoy never used this position, and prime minister Pedro Sánchez did not use it in his first government, but he did it in the second one. In March 2021, after the resignation of Pablo Iglesias as Second DPM, the tradition of appointing a minister of economic affairs as Second DPM was resumed. In July 2021, Nadia Calviño was promoted to first DPM and Yolanda Díaz, the Labour Minister, was promoted to Second DPM.

Powers
The office of second deputy prime minister does not possess special constitutional powers beyond its responsibility as a member of the Council of Ministers. The position is regulated in the Government Act of 1997 and it only specifies that the raison d'être of the office is to replace the Prime Minister when the office is vacant, or the premier is absence or ill. The second deputy prime minister only assume this responsibility if the first deputy could not do it.

List of officeholders
Office name:
Second Vice Presidency of the Government (1974–1975; 1977–1981; 1981–1982; 1996–2000; 2003–2011; 2020–present)
Vice Presidency of the Government for Interior Affairs (1975–1976)
Second Vice Presidency of the Government for Economic Affairs (2000–2003)
Vice Presidency of the Government for Territorial Policy (2011)

See also
 Deputy Prime Minister of Spain
 Third Deputy Prime Minister of Spain
 Fourth Deputy Prime Minister of Spain

References

Lists of political office-holders in Spain
Deputy Prime Ministers of Spain